Leonard Frederick Puddefoot (22 November 1898 – 1996) was an English football player and manager.

Career

Playing career
Puddefoot started his career at West Ham United and appeared in the team photograph for the 1919–20 season. He played with French club Cette in the 1921–22 season.

He joined Falkirk from West Ham United on a month's trial, following his brother Syd, who had moved across the border for a then record transfer fee of £5,000 in February 1922. Puddefoot played a single game for the Scottish club, the first game of the 1922–23 season against Hibernian on 16 August 1922.

Coaching career
Puddefoot coached Swedish side Örgryte between 1927 and 1928. The team won the Allsvenskan that season, but due to the dual-league system at the time, they were not crowned champions.

References

1898 births
1996 deaths
People from Limehouse
Footballers from the London Borough of Tower Hamlets
English footballers
Association football forwards
West Ham United F.C. players
FC Sète 34 players
Falkirk F.C. players
Scottish Football League players
English football managers
English expatriate footballers
English expatriate sportspeople in France
Expatriate footballers in France
English expatriate football managers
English expatriate sportspeople in Sweden
Expatriate football managers in Sweden
Örgryte IS managers